Janez Orešnik (born 12 December 1935) is a Slovene linguist. 

He was born in Ljubljana, Slovenia. He finished his undergraduate studies in comparative Indo-European linguistics at the University of Ljubljana in 1958, and completed his Ph.D. in Germanic Linguistics at the same institution in 1965. He continued with post-doctoral studies at the University of Copenhagen (1959–1961), University of Zagreb (1962–1963), University of Reykjavik (1965–1966) and Harvard University (1969–1970). 

Orešnik is an internationally recognized specialist in comparative linguistics. He served as chair of the Department of Comparative and General Linguistics at the University of Ljubljana from 1990 to 2004. He is a member of the Slovenian Academy of Sciences and Arts and a member of the European Academy of Sciences and Arts.

Until 1990 Orešnik focused on Germanic comparative linguistics and on Scandinavian languages, especially Icelandic. He formulated and partly substantiated some phonological rules of Icelandic. He described several non-standard phenomena of Icelandic phonology, especially within the preterit subjunctive and the imperative. His main publication from this period is Studies in the Phonology and Morphology of Icelandic (1985). The volume won the Slovenian Boris Kidrič Foundation Award in 1987. Since 1985 Orešnik, together with a team of younger colleagues, has been developing a theory of strong and weak variants in syntax within Natural Linguistics; that is, synonymous syntactic units that compete with one another in the history of the language. The team has formulated hypotheses about the direction of this competition and has checked the hypotheses in language material. The group organized two international conferences on Natural Linguistics (including the theory of strong and weak variants) at the University of Maribor, Slovenia, in 1993 and 1996. This theory is sometimes called the Slovenian model of Natural Syntax in international circles. After 1999, Orešnik abandoned the notion of strong and weak variants, calling them (morpho)syntactic variants instead. He has published two volumes on this framework: A predictable aspect of (morpho)syntactic variants (2001), and Naturalness in (morpho)syntax: English examples (2004).

Janez Orešnik received the Golden Order of Merit (zlati red za zasluge) of the Republic of Slovenia in 2004 and the highest Slovenian academic recognition, the Zois Award for lifetime achievements, on November 21, 2007.

References

Living people
1935 births
University of Ljubljana alumni
Faculty of Humanities and Social Sciences, University of Zagreb alumni
Harvard University alumni
Academic staff of the University of Ljubljana
Linguists from Slovenia
Members of the Slovenian Academy of Sciences and Arts
Members of the European Academy of Sciences and Arts
Grammarians from Slovenia